Baudin was an electoral district of the House of Assembly in the Australian state of South Australia from 1977 to 1993. It was in the southern suburbs of Adelaide. In 1977, the polling places were: Christie Downs, Christies Beach, Hackham, Hackham East, Hallett Cove, Moana, Noarlunga, O'Sullivan Beach, Port Noarlunga and Seaford.

Most of the suburbs went to the newly created seat of Kaurna at the 1993 election.

Member

Election results

References 

Former Members of the Parliament of South Australia

External links
1985 & 1989 election boundaries, page 18 & 19

Former electoral districts of South Australia
1977 establishments in Australia
1993 disestablishments in Australia
Constituencies established in 1977
Constituencies disestablished in 1993